Isimovo (İsäm) is a rural locality (a selo) and the administrative centre of Isimovsky Selsoviet, Kugarchinsky District, Bashkortostan, Russia. The population was 708 as of 2010. There are 6 streets.

Geography 
Isimovo is located 26 km south of Mrakovo (the district's administrative centre) by road. Maloisimovo is the nearest rural locality.

References 

Rural localities in Kugarchinsky District